Grandad Rudd is a 1935 comedy featuring the Dad and Dave characters created by Steele Rudd and based on a play by Rudd. It was a sequel to On Our Selection, and was later followed by Dad and Dave Come to Town and Dad Rudd, MP.

Plot
The movie's plot is similar to that of the play: Dad Rudd (Bert Bailey) has become a successful father but is very tight with his money and oppresses his sons Dave (Fred MacDonald), Joe (William McGowan) and Dan (George Lloyd). The sons eventually stand up to their father and manage to persuade him to give them a wage increase – but he increases their rent by an equal amount.

As in the play, there is a serious subplot about Dad's grandchild Betty (Elaine Hamill) who becomes engaged to a corrupt neighbour, Henry Cook (John D’Arcy), despite the true love of another farmer, Tom Dalley (John Cameron). The climax involves a comic cricket game involving the Rudds.

Cast

 Bert Bailey as Dad Rudd
 Fred MacDonald as Dave Rudd
 George Lloyd as Dan
 William McGowan as Joe
 Kathleen Hamilton as Madge
 Lilias Adeson as Lil
 Les Warton as Regan
 Elaine Hamill as Betty
 John Cameron as Tom
 John D'Arcy as Henry Cook
 Molly Raynor as Amelia Banks
 Bill Stewart as Banks
 Marie D'Alton as Mrs. Banks
 Marguerite Adele as Shirley Sanderson
 George Blackwood as School-Master
 Ambrose Foster as Young Dave
 Peggy Yeoman as Mum Rudd

Original play

The play Gran'dad Rudd was first produced in 1917, being based on the stories Grandpa's Selection and Our New Selection.

Plot
The story is set twenty years after the events of the 1912 play, On Our Selection: Dad has become a prosperous farmer and member of Parliament, while Dave has married Lily and become a father. Dad tries to bully Dave and his other son Joe (who has also married), but their wives encourage them to rebel against their father.

There were subplots involving a love triangle between Dad's granddaughter Nell, handsome Tom Dalley, who has invented a potato harvester, and unscrupulous produce agent Henry Cook; the return of a prodigal son, Dan Rudd, keen to claim Dad's estate, and his romance with Amelia Banks; and their neighbours, Mrs Regan and the Banks family.

Original Production
The original production was presented by Bert Bailey and Julius Grant, and saw Bert Bailey and Fred MacDonald repeat their stage roles as Dad and Dave respectively. Making its debut on 22 September 1917, it ran for seven weeks in that city, only ending because the theatre had to vacate for another production. It then toured around the country over the next few years, although it was never as successful as On Our Selection.

Production

Development
The box office success of On Our Selection (1932) saw Cinesound announce plans to make Gran'dad Rudd as a follow up almost immediately, but Steele Rudd issued a statement claiming that since he wrote the play, no movie could be made without his permission. For a time there was talk the second Dad Rudd film would be Rudd's New Selection, but this did not eventuate.

It was originally reported that Bert Bailey and Ken G. Hall would write the script, as they had done for On Our Selection, but eventually the job of adaptation went to Vic Roberts and George D. Parker.

Although Grandad Rudd'''s production had been planned prior to making Strike Me Lucky (1934), its importance to Cinesound grew when that earlier film failed at the box office and the new studio needed a hit.

Shooting
Shooting took place over five weeks. On this and the other two Dad Rudd sequels, Cinesound paid Bert Bailey £150 a week plus 25% of the profits.

Reception
Ken G Hall later said the film was successful "but it was not in the On Our Selection class as a money-spinner". According to Bert Bailey's obituary, the star thought this drop was caused in part by him playing the role with a clean shaven top lip. "The slight change took him out of character."

The film was released in England under the title of Ruling the Roost.

Cinesound originally intended to follow this movie with a version of Robbery Under Arms'' but decided not to proceed because of uncertainty arising from a ban the NSW government had on films about bushrangers. The company ended up ceasing production for several months in 1935 to enable Hall to travel to Hollywood and research production methods.

References

External links
Grandad Rudd in the Internet Movie Database
Grandad Rudd at Australian Screen Online
Grandad Rudd at Oz Movies
Copyright paperwork relating to original play at National Archives of Australia

1935 films
1935 comedy films
Films based on works by Steele Rudd
Films directed by Ken G. Hall
Australian comedy films
Australian black-and-white films
1930s Australian films
1930s English-language films
Cinesound Productions films